Agalinis (false foxglove) is a genus of about 70 species in North, Central, and South America that until recently was aligned with members of the family Scrophulariaceae.  As a result of numerous molecular phylogenetic studies based on various chloroplast DNA (cpDNA) loci, it was shown to be more closely related to members of the Orobanchaceae. Agalinis species are hemiparasitic, which is a character that in part describes the Orobanchaceae.

The first detailed study of this genus began with Francis W. Pennell around 1908, and his earliest major publication of the North American members of this genus appeared in 1913. Dr. Judith Canne-Hilliker began to revise Pennell's treatment in 1977.  Her taxonomic, anatomical, and developmental studies have greatly enhanced our understanding of this sometimes perplexing group.  In particular, her studies of the seed surfaces using electron microscopy has shown that the seeds are diagnostic for delimiting species and has resulted in a realignment of Pennell's classification of the group. In the 1990s Gregg Dieringer investigated the reproductive ecology of several Agalinis spp., to include the self-incompatible Agalinis strictifolia and the autogamous bee-visited Agalinis skinneriana.  Much remains to be studied in this regard, however.

One species of Agalinis, Agalinis acuta, is federally listed. This is mainly due to continued habitat loss within its historically known range.  There are a number of species in North America that are ranked at the state and federal level.  However, many of the species considered rare are ranked at the state level and represent species on the periphery of their range.  There are a number of rare (and endemic) species that are not noted at the state or federal level, and the biogeography of this group in North America has yet to be studied in detail, and is poorly understood.

Species

References

 
Orobanchaceae genera
Taxa named by Constantine Samuel Rafinesque